John Cocke (December 5, 1828 - September 26, 1909) was a state legislator in Mississippi. He represented Panola County, Mississippi in the Mississippi House of Representatives in 1872 and 1873.

He was born in Tennessee. He was married to Olive Cocke and willed his homestead to her and his granddaughter Sarah O. Nelson.

See also
African-American officeholders during and following the Reconstruction era

References

1909 deaths
1828 births
Members of the Mississippi House of Representatives